Kondrovo is the name of several inhabited localities in Russia.

Urban localities
Kondrovo, Kaluga Oblast, a town in Dzerzhinsky District of Kaluga Oblast

Rural localities
Kondrovo, Tula Oblast, a village in Khitrovskaya Rural Administration of Uzlovsky District in Tula Oblast